Benni Efrat (born 1936) is an Israeli painter, sculptor, printmaker and filmmaker who was born in Beirut, Lebanon.

Biography
Benni Efrat immigrated to Palestine in 1947. From 1959 to 1961, he studied at the Avni Institute of Art and Design in Tel Aviv under Yehezkel Streichman (1906–1993). From 1966 to 1976, he lived in London, where he studied at Saint Martin's School of Art in London.

Art career
Benni Efrat was one of the first of Israeli Conceptual artists and influenced others in this direction (e.g., Joshua Neustein, Michael Gitlin, Buky Schwartz). His works were systems of components which spoke for themselves and sought to represent no more than the sum of their parts. In the mid-1970s his displays were accompanied by films, on the back of which the artist had painted. After settling in New York City in 1976, became involved with conceptual art, producing drawings, prints and photographs that explore energy, space and the perception in sculpture.  Efrat currently lives in Belgium.

Awards and recognition
 1966 America-Israel Cultural Foundation
 1969 Sixth Paris Biennale for Young Artists
 1974 Sandberg Prize for Israeli Art, Israel Museum of Jerusalem
 1992 America-Israel Cultural Foundation

Gallery

See also
Visual arts in Israel

References

External links 
 
 
 
 Bex, F., W. van Mulders, and H. van Pelt, Beyond Surface: Peter Berg, Benni Efrat, Tim Head, Buky Schwartz, Antwerp.  Internationaal Cultureel Centrum, 1980.
 Gintz, Claude, Benni Efrat: Quest for Light, Paris, Internationaal Cultureel Centrum, 1982.
 Ikon Gallery, In fusion: New European Art: Ben Bella, Carlos Capelan, Benni Efrat, Chohreh Feyzdjou, Claudio Goulart, Ying Liang, Lea Lubin, As M'Bengue, Flavio Pons, Felix de Rooy, Ohannes Tapyuli, Birmingham, UK, Ikon Gallery, 1993.
 Internationaal Cultureel Centrum, Nature's Factory, Winter 2046, 1888: Benni Efrat and Ronny SomeckWinter 2046, Jerusalem, The Israel Museum, 1998.
 Internationaal Cultureel Centrum, Benni Efrat: Putney Bridge, 1976.  Printed After A Film Projected on a Blackboard, Wiped and Scribbled on With White Chalk, New York City, Whitney Museum of American Art, 1977.

Israeli painters
1936 births
Living people
Israeli conceptual artists
Israeli contemporary artists
Sandberg Prize recipients
Israeli sculptors
Jewish sculptors
Modern sculptors
Artists from Beirut
Lebanese Jews
Israeli Jews
Israeli printmakers
Lebanese emigrants to Israel
Israeli people of Lebanese-Jewish descent
Alumni of Saint Martin's School of Art